Live & More is a two-disc live album between Roberta Flack and Peabo Bryson.

Reception

Recorded and released in December 1980 this live album would chart in 1981 at number ten on the R&B album charts.

In 1983, the duo would record a studio album called, Born to Love.

Track listing 
"Only Heaven Can Wait (For Love)" (Eric Mercury, Roberta Flack)/ "You Are My Heaven" (Eric Mercury, Stevie Wonder) - 9:30 
"Make the World Stand Still" (Peabo Bryson, Roberta Flack) - 5:46  (NEW studio recording]
"Feel the Fire" (Peabo Bryson) - 8:30
"God Don't Like Ugly" (Gwen Guthrie) - 4:58
"If Only for One Night" (Brenda Russell) - 5:53  (NEW studio recording]
"Love Is a Waiting Game"  (Peabo Bryson, Roberta Flack) - 7:24  (NEW studio recording]
"Reachin' for the Sky"  (Peabo Bryson) - 7:39
"Killing Me Softly with His Song" (Charles Fox, Norman Gimbel) - 5:48
"More Than Everything" (Peabo Bryson, Roberta Flack) - 4:02  (NEW studio recording] 
"Feel Like Makin' Love" (Eugene McDaniels) - 5:48
"When Will I Learn" (Peabo Bryson) - 4:37
"Don't Make Me Wait Too Long" (Stevie Wonder) - 9:07
"Back Together Again" (James Mtume, Reggie Lucas) - 6:21
"Love in Every Season/I Believe in You" (Peabo Bryson) - 12:24

Personnel 
 Peabo Bryson – lead vocals, arrangements (2, 6, 9)
 Roberta Flack – lead vocals, arrangements (2, 6, 9)
 Barry Miles – keyboards, Moog synthesizer, arrangements (2, 6, 9), conductor 
 Vance Taylor – keyboards, backing vocals 
 Jim Boling – synthesizers, trumpet 
 Ed Walsh – synthesizers 
 Richard Horton – guitars 
 Georg Wadenius – guitars, backing vocals 
 Marcus Miller – bass, backing vocals 
 Dwight Watkins – bass, backing vocals 
 Andre Robinson – drums 
 Buddy Williams – drums, backing vocals 
 Errol "Crusher" Bennett – percussion 
 Chuck Bryson – percussion, backing vocals 
 Ron Dover – tenor saxophone 
 Daniel Dillard – trombone 
 Thaddeus Johnson – trumpet, flugelhorn 
 Terry Dukes – backing vocals 
 Yvonne Lewis – backing vocals 
 Luther Vandross – backing vocals, BGV arrangements 
 Brenda White – backing vocals

Production 
 Peabo Bryson – producer 
 Roberta Flack – producer
 Tony Kain – engineer 
 Hamil Lindeman – engineer 
 Chris Tergesen – engineer, additional engineer 
 David Hewitt – remote unit engineer  
 Bob Defrin – art direction, design 
 Jim Houghton – photography

Charts

Singles

References

External links
 Roberta Flack &Peabo Bryson-Live & More at Discogs

Roberta Flack albums
Peabo Bryson albums
Vocal duet albums
1980 live albums
Atlantic Records live albums